William Francis Thorpe (7 January 1894 – 6 January 1953) was an Australian rules footballer who played with Richmond and Fitzroy in the Victorian Football League (VFL).

Thorpe also played with Footscray, Port Melbourne, Northcote, Prahran and Camberwell in the Victorian Football Association.

Notes

External links 

1894 births
1953 deaths
Australian rules footballers from Melbourne
Richmond Football Club players
Fitzroy Football Club players
Port Melbourne Football Club players
Northcote Football Club players
Prahran Football Club players
Camberwell Football Club players
People from West Melbourne, Victoria